Buganak (Boğanaq) is a rural locality (a selo) in Azikeyevsky Selsoviet, Beloretsky District, Bashkortostan, Russia. The population was 773 as of 2010. There are 18 streets.

Geography 
Buganak is located 18 km southwest of Beloretsk (the district's administrative centre) by road. Azikeyevo is the nearest rural locality.

References 

Rural localities in Beloretsky District